Minor Threat (also referred to as First Two Seven Inches) is a compilation album by the American hardcore punk band Minor Threat. It was released in March 1984 through Dischord Records. The compilation consisted of the group's first and second extended plays, Minor Threat (originally released June 1981) and In My Eyes (originally released December 1981). The 1984 Minor Threat LP featured the same cover as the 1981 Minor Threat EP, depicting vocalist Ian MacKaye's younger brother Alec (Untouchables, The Faith). The image has been imitated by punk bands such as Rancid on their album ...And Out Come the Wolves and in the Major Threat ad campaign by Nike.

All the tracks from the Minor Threat and In My Eyes EPs are available on CD on the Minor Threat's 1989 compilation album Complete Discography and also on Dischord 1981: The Year in 7"s.

Album information
"Straight Edge", a song from the Minor Threat EP, inadvertently inspired the straight edge movement. The song, while written merely as an account of MacKaye's personal views and lifestyle, was seen to be a call for abstinence from drugs and alcohol, a then-unusual concept  for punk rock and rock music in general.

"Out of Step," from the follow-up In My Eyes EP, further demonstrates the aesthetic: "Don't smoke/ Don't drink/ Don't fuck/ At least I can fucking think/ I can't keep up/ Can't keep up/ Can't keep up/ I'm out of step with the world." Some in Minor Threat, particularly drummer Jeff Nelson, took exception to what they saw as MacKaye's imperious attitude on the song. This spurred the band to re-record the track as the title song of their 1983 Out of Step album, on which MacKaye clearly sang "I don't drink/smoke/fuck" (as was the intent of his words all along), and an argument between him and Nelson in which he states that "this is no set of rules, I'm not telling you what to do" was surreptitiously recorded by producer Don Zientara to be dubbed onto the track right before the final chorus. According to Mark Andersen and Mark Jenkins' Dance of Days: Two Decades of Punk in the Nation's Capital, this argument was over exactly what would be said in the message that Nelson wanted MacKaye to record stating essentially what he said without knowing it was being recorded.

"In My Eyes" is an anti-drug song which has been covered by rap metal band Rage Against the Machine, among others. Along with "Straight Edge" and "Out of Step," "In My Eyes" helped to solidify views of Minor Threat as a band with an anti-drug platform. Unlike the original "Straight Edge," a relatively standard hardcore composition, each verse of "In My Eyes" seethes with anger and contempt, building up to the cathartic release of the chorus.

"Guilty of Being White" led to accusations of racial prejudice, due to perceived similarities between the song's lyrics and that of white power rhetoric which often frames the majority race as victims at the hands of a minority group. However, MacKaye has strongly denied such intentions and said that some listeners misinterpreted his words. According to him, the song was written about his experiences growing up in Washington, D.C. at a time of high racial tension, where the majority race in his school was African-American and many black students were hostile towards whites. Slayer later covered the song, though they changed the lyric "guilty of being white" to "guilty of being right" at the song's climax.

"Minor Threat" is a youth anthem which has been covered by bands as diverse as Sublime, Silverchair, Rise Against, Title Fight, and Pennywise.

"Steppin' Stone" is a cover, written by the team of Tommy Boyce and Bobby Hart in the mid-1960s, and first recorded by Paul Revere & the Raiders and later the Monkees. "Steppin' Stone" has been covered by many punk acts including the Sex Pistols, Johnny Thunders, Untouchables, State of Alert, and Government Issue.

Track listing

Personnel
 Ian MacKaye – lead vocals
 Lyle Preslar – guitar, backing vocals
 Brian Baker – bass, backing vocals
 Jeff Nelson – drums

Additional performers
 Alec MacKaye – backing vocals

Production
 Skip Groff; Minor Threat – producers
 Don Zientara – engineer
 Minor Threat; Don Zientara – mixing
 Skip Groff – mastering
 Jeff Nelson – graphic design
 Susie Josephson – cover art (Minor Threat)
 Gary Cousins – front cover art (In My Eyes)
 Anna Connelly – back cover art (In My Eyes)
 Glen E. Friedman; Al Flipside; Naomi Petersen – photography

References

1984 compilation albums
Dischord Records compilation albums
Minor Threat albums
Compilation albums published posthumously